Dosinia elegans, or the elegant dosinia, is a species of bivalve mollusc in the family Veneridae. It can be found along the Atlantic coast of North America, ranging from North Carolina to Texas.

Predators
It is eaten by the moon snail.

Size
It can get as big as 4 inches.

References

Dosinia
Bivalves described in 1846